The Apprentice is a rock album by John Martyn. Recorded at CaVa Studios, Glasgow, Scotland. Originally released on CD by Permanent Records, catalogue number PERM CD 1.

The demo recordings for The Apprentice were the trigger for Martyn's being dropped by Island Records in 1988. Despite this, when the album (recorded in its final form at Martyn's own expense) appeared in 1990, it was well reviewed and regarded as something of a return to form by Martyn enthusiasts.

Track listing
All tracks composed by John Martyn except where indicated.

"Live On Love"
"The River"
"Look At The Girl"
"Income Town"
"Send Me One Line"
"Deny this Love"
"Hold Me"
"Upo"
"The Apprentice"
"The Moment"1
"Patterns In The Rain" (Foster Patterson)
1Not included in LP release

Additional tracks included on 2007 remastered release via One World

"Deny This Love" (remix)
"The Apprentice" (live)
"The River" (live)
"Send Me One Line" (live)
"Look At The Girl" (live)

Personnel
(as listed on original CD release)
John Martyn - guitars, vocals
Foster Patterson - keyboards
Aran Ahmun - drums
Colin Tully - saxophone on "The River", "Upo"
Andy Shepherd - saxophone on "Deny This Love", "Send Me One Line", "Look At The Girl"
Danny Cummings - percussion, backing vocals
Danusia - backing vocals
Taj Wyzgowski - rhythm guitar on "Live On Love", "The Apprentice"

References

External links
The Official John Martyn Website

John Martyn albums
1990 albums
Permanent Records albums